Edward Richard Assheton Penn Curzon, 6th Earl Howe,  (7 August 1908 – 29 May 1984), styled Viscount Curzon from 1929 to 1964, was a British peer.

Early life and background
Curzon was born in St George Hanover Square, London, Middlesex, the eldest son of Francis Curzon, 5th Earl Howe, and his wife and first cousin Mary Curzon, Lady Howe.

He was educated at Eton College, and graduated from Corpus Christi College, Cambridge.

Naval career
Curzon joined the London Division of the Royal Naval Volunteer Reserve as a Probationary Midshipman on 18 September 1928, and was appointed an Acting Sub-Lieutenant on 21 July 1931, receiving promotion to Sub-Lieutenant on 7 November 1932, with seniority from 21 July 1932. He left the RNVR in 1936 or 1937, but returned to RNVR service after the outbreak on the Second World War, being appointed a probationary temporary sub-lieutenant on 23 February 1940. He was promoted to Lieutenant on 20 May 1940, and served aboard the cruiser  from June 1940 to December 1941, then the battleship  (named after his illustrious ancestor the first Earl Howe) from May 1942 to July 1945, serving in the rank of acting temporary Lieutenant Commander from December 1943 until April 1944. He left the Navy in April 1946.

Political career
Curzon had an active career in public service. He was first elected Member of the London County Council for Battersea South in 1937, serving until 1946. In November 1940 he was appointed a Sheriff for Buckinghamshire in the King's Bench Division of the High Court of Justice.

His career continued post-war. Curzon was appointed a Justice of the Peace in 1946, and was elected as an Alderman of Buckinghamshire in 1958, and was a County Councillor from 1973, serving as Vice Chairman of Buckinghamshire County Council from 1976. He was appointed a Deputy Lieutenant of Buckinghamshire on 1 February 1960, and was again appointed a Sheriff for Buckinghamshire in the Queen's Bench Division of the High Court of Justice in November 1963.

Curzon succeeded to the title of Earl Howe on 1 September 1964, taking his seat in the House of Lords, and making his maiden speech on 13 December 1965, during a debate on transport issues in Greater London. He was a campaigner for road safety — which did not prevent him from suggesting that the speed limit on motorways should be raised from 70 to 100 mph.

He also served as the President of the South Buckinghamshire Conservative and Unionist Association from 1965 to 1972, then President of the Chesham and Amersham Conservative Association. In addition he served as Commissioner for the St John Ambulance Brigade for Buckinghamshire, 1953–1955, was a Trustee of the King William IV Naval Asylum in Penge. He also served as President of the British Automobile Racing Club, the Institute of Road Safety Officers, and the Fiat Motor Club (Great Britain). He was a Steward and Vice-Chairman of the Royal Automobile Club, a director of Automobile Proprietary Ltd. and Motoring Services Ltd., and a member of the RAC Public Policy Committee, the British Motor Sport Council, and the Royal National Lifeboat Institution Committee of Management. He was an Honorary Fellow of the Institute of Road Transport Engineers.

In 1973 Curzon and his wife second wife Grace appeared in Nick Broomfield's short film Proud to Be British.

Awards
On 26 June 1953 Curzon was made an Officer of the Most Venerable Order of the Hospital of Saint John of Jerusalem, and was promoted to Commander of the Order on 20 June 1956. He was made a Commander of the Most Excellent Order of the British Empire in the 1961 Birthday Honours for "political and public services in Buckinghamshire".

Marriages and issue
Lord Howe married firstly Priscilla Crystal Frances Blundell Weigall, only daughter of Sir William Ernest George Archibald Weigall, 1st Baronet, and wife Grace Emily Blundell Maple, on 23 July 1935 and they were divorced in 1943. They had two daughters: 
 Lady Priscilla Mary Rose Curzon (12 February 1940) she married Charles William Lyle Keen, of The Old Rectory, Duntisbourne Rouse, Gloucestershire, on 21 July 1962. They have four children:
 Laura Mary Catherine Keen (1 May 1963) she married The Hon. Nicholas Beatty (born 1961), son of David Field Beatty, 2nd Earl Beatty, and fourth wife Diane Kirk Blundell, on 29 September 1990. They have one son:
 David Brin Charles Beatty (1992)
 Eleanor Margaret Keen (4 April 1965) 
 Alice Priscilla Lyle Keen (Reading, Berkshire, 31 August 1966) she married Peter C. P. Oswald (born 1965) in 1994 and has three children
 William Walter Maurice Keen (Oxford, Oxfordshire, 4 March 1970) he married María Fernández Ache on 10 August 2002. They have one daughter:
 Dafne María Keen Fernández (Madrid, 4 January 2005)
 Lady Jennifer Jane Curzon (12 May 1941) she married Alan Joseph Ponté, son of Captain Leo Ponté, on 6 September 1962. They have five children: 
 David Joseph Marcus Blundell Ponté (30 March 1964) 
 Gideon Léo FitzRoy Ponté (11 May 1965)
 Rebecca Kate Priscilla Clara Ponté (23 April 1967) she married David H. Kirton on 1 May 1995
 Joshua Albert Coriat Ponté (21 August 1970)
 Luke Antony Archibald Ponté (4 September 1974)

He married secondly on 30 April 1946 Grace Lilian Barker Wakeling, daughter of Stephen Frederick Wakeling and wife Mary Anna Hartley Tarr, paternal granddaughter of Lt Edward French Wakeling and wife Susannah Greygoose and maternal granddaughter of Cornelius John Tarr and wife Grace Hannah Davies, who were both born in South Africa. They had two daughters: 
 Lady Mary-Gaye Georgiana Lorna Curzon (21 February 1947) she married firstly Kevin Esmond Peter Cooper-Key on 18 December 1971 and they were divorced in 1976. They have one daughter. She married secondly John Austen Anstruther-Gough-Calthorpe on 27 May 1977 and they were divorced in 1986. They have three children. She married thirdly Old Harrovian Entrepreneur Jeffrey Bonas, son of Harry George Bonas (b. Coventry, West Midlands) and wife Winifred Hodgkins, paternal grandson of George Bonas (son of John Bonas, of French Huguenot descent, and wife Sophy Dewis) and wife Alice Mary Smith and maternal grandson of Samuel Hodgkins (son of John Hodgkins and wife Kezia Jenks) and wife Annie Spaulton (daughter of James Spaulton and wife Mary Saxton). The Bonas family, once grocers and butchers, also owned textile mills in Castle Gresley and Burton-on-Trent under the company name, "Bonas Brothers"; it closed operations in the 1980s, having produced, as its final line, elastic for women's tights. They married in 1988 and they were divorced in 1994. They have one daughter. She married fourthly Christopher Shaw of Clan Shaw of Tordarroch on 17 December 1996 and they were divorced. They had no issue.
 Pandora Lorna Mary Cooper-Key (16 March 1973), she married Matthew Mervyn-Jones in 2006. They have two children.
 Georgiana Moireach Gay Anstruther-Gough-Calthorpe (14 October 1978), she married Robert Butler. They have a daughter, who was born in 2007.
 Isabella Amaryllis Charlotte Anstruther-Gough-Calthorpe (3 March 1980), she married Sam Branson, son of Sir Richard Charles Nicholas Branson and first wife Kristen Tomassi, on 6 March 2013. They have two children.
 Jacobi Richard Penn Anstruther-Gough-Calthorpe (10 May 1983)
 Cressida Curzon Bonas (18 February 1989)
 Lady Charlotte Elizabeth Anne Curzon (5 July 1948 – 11 January 2019). She married Captain John Barry Dinan in 1988. They have one son: 
 Richard Assheton Dermot Dinan (1986)

Succession
He was succeeded in the earldom by his second cousin, Frederick Curzon, 7th Earl Howe.

References

External links
 

Edward
Edward
6
1908 births
1984 deaths
People educated at Eton College
Alumni of Corpus Christi College, Cambridge
Royal Naval Volunteer Reserve personnel of World War II
Royal Navy officers of World War II
Members of London County Council
Members of Buckinghamshire County Council
Commanders of the Order of the British Empire
Officers of the Order of St John
Commanders of the Order of St John